A Respectable Trade is a 1995 historical novel by Philippa Gregory set in the Bristol docks in 1787.

Adaptation
Gregory adapted her work into a four-part TV serial which was broadcast by the BBC in 1998 and by the PBS in the United States in the fall of 1999. The series was partially filmed on site in Bristol, utilising the former house (and now museum) of plantation and slave owner John Pinney.

Reception
A Respectable Trade was nominated in several BAFTA categories, including best serial, winning one BAFTA for Frances Tempest's historical costumes.

Cast
Warren Clarke, Josiah Cole a trader in sugar, rum and eventually slaves
Emma Fielding, Frances Scott, his new aristocratic wife
Ariyon Bakare, Mehuru, an educated African slave
Grahame Fox, John Bates Slave driver

References

1995 British novels
British novels adapted into television shows
Novels about slavery
1990s British drama television series
BBC television dramas
Television shows based on British novels
1998 British television series debuts
1998 British television series endings
Fiction set in 1787
Novels set in the 1780s
Novels set in Bristol
HarperCollins books